Alina Rîpanu (born 29 October 1981) is a Romanian sprinter. She competed in the women's 4 × 400 metres relay at the 2004 Summer Olympics. Apart from the Olympics, Rîpanu won silver at the 2004 IAAF World Indoor Championships – Women's 4 × 400 metres relay.

References

1981 births
Living people
Athletes (track and field) at the 2004 Summer Olympics
Romanian female sprinters
Olympic athletes of Romania
Place of birth missing (living people)
World Athletics Indoor Championships medalists
Olympic female sprinters